TwinMOS Technologies (branded as TwinMOS; formally TwinMOS Technologies Inc.) is a Taiwanese manufacturer and distributor of computer hardware established in 1998 in November of same year they partnered with Rambus Incorporated. The company specializes in the development and manufacturing of computer memory products. in addition to that TwinMOS produces computer peripherals and accessories such as memory cards, USB Flash drives, power supply units etc. Their head office is situated in Dubai, UAE since 2002.

TwinMOS has manufacturing facilities located in Hukou Township, Hsinchu County, Taiwan and Dongguan and Xinchang County in China. The Xinchang factory began production in 1999, and the company has offices in multiple countries, including the United States, Germany, Netherlands, Middle East, Singapore, Hong Kong, Japan, Bangladesh, South Korea, Taiwan, and China.

TwinMOS Technologies Middle East FZE distributes its products under its own brand name, TwinMOS, or through Original equipment manufacturer (OEM) and original design manufacturing (ODM) arrangements. The company exports to 45 countries, including countries in Africa and the CIS region, and it opened its operation in India in 2005.

In the United Arab Emirates, TwinMOS serves as its own distributor for its products. The company's hub for sales and business development for Africa, the rest of the Gulf, Persian Gulf, Levant, Eastern Europe, CIS, and South Asia is located in Dubai. In other countries, TwinMOS uses a distributor to manage its sales and business development.

Products

Memory 
 
TwinMOS is known for its range of DDR, DDR2, DDR3, and DDR4 computer memory. RAM is available in SO-DIMM and U-DIMM

In February 2007, TwinMOS announced a DDR2 memory kit that, unusually for kits of that size at the time, operated at above JEDEC specifications.

In January 2022, TwinMOS announced a DDR4 Tornado X6 for Desktop with 3200 MHz frequency

Solid-state drive 
On 1 June 2007 TwinMOS announced its first SATA II 2.5" solid-state drives (SSDs) with 32 GB or 64 GB of capacity. in Computex 2007

Peripherals

USB HUB 
On 1 August 2022, TwinMOS Relanced it's EzeeHUB, USB hub products with USB 3.0

Power supply 
On 1 July 2022 TwinMOS released the new of 80 Plus Bronze PSU for Desktop with the names of XPower and SmartX

History 
Twin­MOS Tech­nologies, founded in 1998 in Tai­wan. It started as a manufacturer of memory chips for system integrators. in 2002 its headquarter was moved to DAFZA, Dubai, United Arab Emirates They launched DDR2 256MB Twister DRAM For Desktop in April 2004, and PC2700 DRAM in 2002 in the market. and in 2006 they launched 4GB and 8GB SDHC cards TwinMOS announced it's merger with Singapore-based Memory Devices in the same year and Established HQ in Dubai, United Arab Emirates. They introduced anti-counterfeiting technology in 2005

References

External links 

 TwinMOS (Consumer)

Computer memory companies
Computer peripheral companies
Computer storage companies
Electronics companies of Taiwan
Computer companies established in 1998
Taiwanese brands
Taiwanese companies established in 1998